Ceroprepes proximalis is a moth of the family Pyralidae first described by Francis Walker in 1863. It is found in India, Sri Lanka, Thailand, western Malaysia, Borneo and Sulawesi.

References

Moths of Asia
Moths described in 1863
Phycitini